Kolpino is a municipal city in Kolpinsky District of the federal city of St. Petersburg, Russia, located on the Izhora River (tributary of the Neva)  southeast of St. Petersburg proper. Population:    81,000 (1972); 8,076 (1897).

History
Kolpino was founded in 1722 and was granted town status in 1912. It was one of the chief ironworks of the crown in Russia. Kolpino was also home to an iron foundry of the Russian Admiralty. A sacred image of St. Nicholas in the Trinity Church is visited by numerous pilgrims on May 22 every year.

With the onset of the Great Patriotic War, Kolpino factory workers formed Izhora Battalion, part of the militia, August 24 – September 4, 1941. The front line was held in the immediate vicinity of the plant, which was subjected to heavy enemy shelling. By 1944, only 327 of Kolpino's 2183 houses remained intact. 140,939 shells and 436 aerial bombs fell in Kolpino's neighborhoods and boulevards. According to incomplete data for the war, shelling and starvation in the Kolpino district killed 4,600 people, not counting the dead on the front. By January 1, 1944 Kolpino had only 2196 inhabitants. After the lifting of the siege, people gradually came back from the evacuation and from the army. On January 1, 1945 population was 7404, the beginning of next year – 8914 people.

During the construction of a new residential building, a mass grave was discovered in Kolpino. 888 soldiers and officers of the Red Army were buried in the mass grave in that cemetery. They fell in September 1941.

Economy and transportation
Many people of Kolpino work at Izhorian Plant. Kolpino District also contains tens of other plants.

Kolpino railway station is operable since 1847.

International relations

Twin towns – Sister cities
Kolpino is twinned with:
 Druskininkai, Lithuania
 Huai'an, China
 Rauma, Finland

References

External links

Website of Kolpino

Tsarskoselsky Uyezd
Kolpinsky District
1722 establishments in the Russian Empire